Jean-François Voguet (8 August 1949 – 2 February 2021) was a French politician. He was a member of the Senate of France from 2004–2011, representing the Val-de-Marne department.  He was also a member of the Communist, Republican, and Citizen Group. 

Voguet died from COVID-19 during the COVID-19 pandemic in France.

References

 Page on the Senate website

1949 births
2021 deaths
French Senators of the Fifth Republic
Senators of Val-de-Marne
Deaths from the COVID-19 pandemic in France
French Communist Party politicians
Mayors of places in Île-de-France